Henry Tebay (5 October 1866 – 4 June 1946) was an English cricketer. Tebay was a right-handed batsman. He was born at East Grinstead, Sussex.

Tebay made his first-class debut for Sussex against Nottinghamshire at Trent Bridge in 1886. He made seventeen further first-class appearances for the county, the last of which came against Surrey at the Oval in the 1890 County Championship. In his eighteen first-class matches, he scored a total of 265 runs at an average of 7.36, with a high score of 43.

He died at Bromley, Kent, on 4 June 1946.

References

External links
Henry Tebay at ESPNcricinfo
Henry Tebay at CricketArchive

1866 births
1946 deaths
People from East Grinstead
English cricketers
Sussex cricketers